William Larry Brown (July 9, 1951 – November 24, 2004) was an American novelist, non-fiction and short story writer. He won numerous awards, including the Mississippi Institute of Arts and Letters award for fiction, the Lila Wallace-Reader's Digest Award, and Mississippi's Governor's Award For Excellence in the Arts. He was also the first two-time winner of the Southern Book Award for Fiction.

His notable works include Dirty Work, Father and Son, Joe, and Big Bad Love. The last of these was adapted for a 2001 film of the same name, starring Debra Winger and Arliss Howard. In 2013 a film adaptation of Joe was released, featuring Nicolas Cage.

Independent filmmaker Gary Hawkins has directed an award-winning documentary of Brown's life and work in The Rough South of Larry Brown (2011).

Life and writing
Larry Brown was born on July 9, 1951, and grew up near Oxford, Mississippi. He graduated from high school in Oxford, but did not want to go to college, opting instead for a stint in the Marines. Many years later, he took a creative writing class from the University of Mississippi. Brown worked at a small stove company before joining the city fire department in Oxford.

An avid reader, Brown began writing in 1980 in his spare time while he worked as a firefighter (at City Station No.1 on North Lamar Blvd.) His nonfiction book On Fire describes how Brown, having trouble with sleeping at the fire station, would stay up to read and write while the other firefighters slept. His duties as a firefighter included answering fire alarms on the University of Mississippi campus and in the city of Oxford, including Rowan Oak—the home of William Faulkner, but now a museum. Faulkner died in 1962—on Larry Brown's 11th birthday.

By his own account Brown wrote five unpublished novels, including the first one he wrote about a man-eating bear loose in Yellowstone Park. Brown used these kinds of personal experiences when talking to beginning writers. He could tell them not to become discouraged, if only to judge by the rather unceremonious false starts to his own writing career. Brown also indicated that he wrote hundreds of short stories before he began to be published.

His first publication was a short story that appeared in the June 1982 issue of biker magazine Easyriders. His first books were two collections of short stories: Facing the Music (1988) and Big Bad Love (1990). After 1990, Brown turned to writing full-time and increasingly turned to the novel as his primary form. Brown's novels include Dirty Work (1989), Father and Son (1996), Joe (1991), Fay (2000), and The Rabbit Factory (2003). His later works, especially, are marked by gritty realism, sudden and shocking violence, and diachronic narrative. Brown responded to criticism regarding the "brutality" in his work by saying, "Well that's fine. It's ok if you call it brutal, but just admit by God that it's honest."

In March 2007, Algonquin Books of Chapel Hill published Brown's unfinished novel, A Miracle of Catfish. Although Brown died before finishing the book, the final page of the published version includes his notes about how he wanted the novel to end. The novel includes a lengthy introduction by Brown's editor, Shannon Ravenel, discussing her work on the project and her work with Brown over the years. Except for the novel The Rabbit Factory, all of Brown's books were published by Algonquin Books of Chapel Hill, now a division of Workman Publishing. The paperback editions of Brown's books were issued by various publishers, including Warner Books, Algonquin, Holt, and Vintage Books, a division of Random House.

Brown's nonfiction includes On Fire (1995), on the subject of his 17 years (1973–1990) as a firefighter, and Billy Ray's Farm (2001).

For one semester, Brown taught as a writer-in-residence in the creative writing program at the University of Mississippi, temporarily taking over the position held by his friend Barry Hannah. He later served as visiting writer at the University of Montana in Missoula. He taught briefly at other colleges throughout the United States.

He has been compared to other Southern writers, including Cormac McCarthy, William Faulkner, and Harry Crews. In interviews and some of his essays, Brown cited these authors, along with Flannery O'Connor, Raymond Carver, and Charles Bukowski, as influences.

Brown had also cited contemporary music as an influence, and his tastes were broad. He appeared with the Texas alt-rock band fronted by Alejandro Escovedo, a good friend of his. Brown cited the lyrics of Leonard Cohen as an influence. He had friends in the film industry, including Billy Bob Thornton.

Brown died of an apparent heart attack at his home in the Yocona community, near Oxford, in November 2004.

Works
Facing the Music (1988) – short stories
Dirty Work (1989) – novel
Big Bad Love (1990) – short stories
Joe (1991) – novel
On Fire (1993) – memoir
Father and Son (1996) – novel
Fay (2000) – novel
Billy Ray's Farm: Essays from a Place Called Tula (2001) - essays 
The Rabbit Factory (2003) – novel
A Miracle of Catfish (2007) – novel 
Tiny Love: The Complete Stories of Larry Brown (2019) - short stories

References

External links
Larry Brown at The Mississippi Writer's Page
Larry Brown Collection (MUM00051), The University of Mississippi Department of Archives and Special Collections
Larry Brown's page at The Mississippi Writers and Musicians Project at Starkville High School
The Rough South of Larry Brown, Internet Movie Database(2002)

1951 births
2004 deaths
20th-century American novelists
Novelists from Mississippi
People from Oxford, Mississippi
21st-century American novelists
American male novelists
American male short story writers
20th-century American short story writers
21st-century American short story writers
Writers of American Southern literature
20th-century American male writers
21st-century American male writers